In enzymology, a phosphoribosyl-AMP cyclohydrolase is an enzyme that catalyzes the chemical reaction

1-(5-phosphoribosyl)-AMP + H2O  1-(5-phosphoribosyl)-5-[(5- phosphoribosylamino)methylideneamino]imidazole-4-carboxamide

Thus, the two substrates of this enzyme are 1-(5-phosphoribosyl)-AMP and H2O, whereas its two products are [[1-(5-phosphoribosyl)-5-[(5-]] and [[phosphoribosylamino)methylideneamino]imidazole-4-carboxamide]].

This enzyme belongs to the family of hydrolases, those acting on carbon-nitrogen bonds other than peptide bonds, specifically in cyclic amidines.  The systematic name of this enzyme class is 1-(5-phospho-D-ribosyl)-AMP 1,6-hydrolase. Other names in common use include PRAMP-cyclohydrolase, and phosphoribosyladenosine monophosphate cyclohydrolase.  This enzyme participates in histidine metabolism.

Structural studies

As of late 2007, only one structure has been solved for this class of enzymes, with the PDB accession code .

References

 

EC 3.5.4
Enzymes of known structure